La Esperanza Airport may refer to following airports in Latin America:

 La Esperanza Airport (Bolivia), near La Esperanza, Santa Cruz Department
 La Esperanza Airport (Chile), near Marchigüe, O'Higgins Region 
 La Esperanza Airport (Intibucá), near La Esperanza, Intibucá Department, Honduras
 La Esperanza Airport (Nicaragua), near La Esperanza, South Caribbean Coast Autonomous Region